Irvine Unified School District is a school district in Irvine, California, United States, that serves the city of Irvine.  Established on June 6, 1972, IUSD serves approximately 36,000 K-12 students at twenty-four elementary schools, six middle schools, five K-8 schools, two virtual academy, six comprehensive high schools.

Irvine has been frequently recognized among the top school systems in California and the United States. On the state’s latest Academic Performance Index, which measures overall achievement on a scale of 200 to 1,000, IUSD posted a districtwide score of 921, marking a five-point increase over the previous year.

Irvine schools have earned the state’s highest honor – the label of California Distinguished School – 48 times since 1986, and all four comprehensive high schools have been recognized at least once. All four comprehensive high schools have also earned the distinction as Blue Ribbon Schools, the nation’s highest level of recognition for K-12 campuses. In all, IUSD has produced 13 Blue Ribbon schools since 1983.

Schools

According to USNews, the best ranked...
Elementary School in IUSD is Turtle Rock Elementary
Middle School in IUSD is Vista Verde
High School in IUSD is University High School

Elementary schools
 Alderwood Elementary
 Beacon Park School
 Bonita Canyon Elementary School
 Brywood Elementary School
 Cadence Park School
 Canyon View Elementary School
 College Park Elementary School
 Culverdale Elementary School
 Cypress Village Elementary School
 Deerfield Elementary School
 Eastshore Elementary School
 Eastwood Elementary School 
 Greentree Elementary School
 Loma Ridge Elementary School
 Meadow Park Elementary School
 Northwood Elementary School
 Oak Creek Elementary School
 Plaza Vista School
 Portola Springs Elementary School
 Santiago Hills Elementary School
 Solis Park School
 Springbrook Elementary School
 Stone Creek Elementary School
 Stonegate Elementary School
 Turtle Rock Elementary School
 University Park Elementary School
 Vista Verde School
 Westpark Elementary School
 Woodbury Elementary School

Middle schools
 Beacon Park School
 Cadence Park Middle School
 Jeffrey Trail Middle School
 Lakeside Middle School
 Plaza Vista School
 Rancho San Joaquin Middle School
 Sierra Vista Middle School
 Solis Park School
 South Lake Middle School
 Venado Middle School
 Vista Verde School

High schools 
Creekside High School (Continuation)
Irvine High School
Northwood High School
Portola High School
University High School
Woodbridge High School

Other schools
 Early Childhood Learning Center
 Irvine Adult School
 Irvine Adult Transition Program
 Irvine Home School

See also

List of school districts in Orange County, California

References

External links
Irvine Unified School District

School districts in Orange County, California
School districts established in 1972
1972 establishments in California
Education in Irvine, California